Virgen de Chapi FC is a Peruvian football club, playing in the city of Lima, Peru.

History
Virgen de Chapi FC was founded on October 22, 1992. The club participated in the 1996 Segunda División Peruana, but was relegated the same year.

The club returned to the Peruvian Segunda División, and played from 1998 Segunda División Peruana until 2005, when was relegated to the Copa Perú.

Honours

Regional
Liga Departamental de Lima:
Winners (1): 1995

Liga Provincial de Lima:
Winners (2): 1995, 1997

Liga Distrital de Santa Anita:
Winners (3): 1995, 2018, 2019
Runner-up (2): 2009, 2016

See also
List of football clubs in Peru
Peruvian football league system

External links
 peru.com - Club Virgen de Chapi FC
 RSSSF - Departamental Champions

Football clubs in Peru
Association football clubs established in 1992